Le Dauphin was a French auto maker established in the 3rd arrondissement of Paris by André L. Dauphin. The company first presented a small two-seater cyclecar in the spring of 1941; production ended in 1942.

The car was an open-roof cyclecar with the seats positioned one behind the other. The body was built around a simple tube-based structure, probably inspired by recent developments in airplane construction; there was no separate chassis. The vehicles were produced on a production line at a small factory belonging to Kellner, a coachbuilder previously known for supplying bespoke bodies for chassis of France's luxury car makers. Dauphin versions were made with a petrol engine or an electric engine, with the motor for the petrol version being a two-stroke unit of 100 cc or 175 cc supplied by Zurcher. Petrol for civilian use was becoming unobtainable, and a 2 hp 48-volt electric power unit was substituted. The electric-powered cars were steered from the rear seat, whereas the petrol-engined ones were steered from the front.

Sources and further reading 
 G.N. Georgano: Autos. Encyclopédie complète. 1885 à nos jours. Courtille, 1975 (French)

Defunct motor vehicle manufacturers of France
Car manufacturers of France
Vehicle manufacturing companies established in 1940
Cyclecars
Vehicle manufacturing companies disestablished in 1942
1940 establishments in France
1942 disestablishments in France